Tomislav Brkić and Francisco Cabral defeated Robin Haase and Philipp Oswald in the final, 6–4, 6–4 to win the doubles tennis title at the 2022 Swiss Open Gstaad.

Marc-Andrea Hüsler and Dominic Stricker were the defending champions, but lost in the first round to Elias and Mikael Ymer.

Seeds

Draw

Draw

References

Swiss Open Gstaad - Doubles
2022 Doubles